The Vernon Fitzhugh House is a historic house at 1551 East Hope Street in Fayetteville, Arkansas.  It is a T-shaped two-story, built of brown brick, with extensive use of single-pane glass windows and French doors.  The house was built in 1962 to a design by Arkansas architect Warren Segraves, and is a good example of Mid-Century Modern residential architecture, with deep overhanging eaves, and unusual placement and size of its windows.  It was built for Vernon Fitzhugh, owner of a local business services company.

The house was listed on the National Register of Historic Places in 2017.

See also
National Register of Historic Places listings in Washington County, Arkansas

References

Houses on the National Register of Historic Places in Arkansas
Houses completed in 1962
Houses in Fayetteville, Arkansas
National Register of Historic Places in Fayetteville, Arkansas